Phytocoris obscuratus is a species of plant bugs belonging to the family Miridae, subfamily Mirinae. It can be found in Croatia, France, Greece, North Macedonia, Romania, and Spain.

References 

Insects described in 1959
Hemiptera of Europe
Phytocoris